Pangasinan's 6th congressional district is one of the six congressional districts of the Philippines in the province of Pangasinan. It has been represented in the House of Representatives of the Philippines since 1987. The district consists of the municipalities of Asingan, Balungao, Natividad, Rosales, San Manuel, San Nicolas, San Quintin, Santa Maria, Tayug, and Umingan. It is currently represented in the 19th Congress by Marlyn Primicias-Agabas of the PDP–Laban.

Representation history

Election results

2022

2019

2016

2013

2010

See also
Legislative districts of Pangasinan

References

Congressional districts of the Philippines
Politics of Pangasinan
1987 establishments in the Philippines
Congressional districts of the Ilocos Region
Constituencies established in 1987